Khan Mastana (died 1972) was an Indian actor, music director and composer. He was called shehad jharti aawaz ke maalik.

References

External links

1972 deaths
Year of birth missing
20th-century Indian male actors
Indian male composers
Male actors from Mumbai